Charles Scott Ogilvie (19 December 1884 – 1939) was a Scottish amateur footballer who played as an outside left in the Scottish League for Queen's Park.

Personal life 
Ogilvie emigrated to Canada in October 1912 and worked as a civil engineer. After Canada's entry into the First World War in August 1914, Ogilvie joined the Canadian Expeditionary Force and became a corporal in a Canadian Highlander battalion.

Career statistics

References

1884 births
Scottish footballers
Scottish Football League players
Association football outside forwards
Queen's Park F.C. players
Canadian Expeditionary Force soldiers
Sportspeople from East Renfrewshire
Scottish emigrants to Canada
1939 deaths
Scottish civil engineers